Hingurakgoda Divisional Secretariat is a  Divisional Secretariat  of Polonnaruwa District, of North Central Province, Sri Lanka.

References
 Divisional Secretariats Portal

Hingurakgoda is one of 7 Divisional Secretariats in Polonnaruwa District. Mr. Maithripala Sirisena,the current President in Sri Lanka is born in Polonnaruwa District.

Polonnaruwa district has 07 divisional secretariats. The biggest division is Hingurakgoda. The division has 70878.33 hectares. When consider relative position of this division is bounded by Anuradhapura district from Northern, Alahera and Thamankaduwa from Southern, Medirigiriya and Lankapura from Eastern and Anuradhapura district from Western.

According to absolute situation, this division is situated between latitude 7°53´ to 8°22´ and Eastern longitude 80°45´ to 81°02´ the national grid system says that Hingurakgoda situated between Northern grid number 303–348 km and Eastern grid number 195–228 km.

There are 53 Grama Niladari divisions. According to population census data in 2012 population is about 63000. 2000mm.

When Consider land Use Patterns 45.6% are forests from Whole lands. Among this lands Girithale, Hurulu, Anamulandawa and Kaudulla national Forests are main 16.87%. Lands form rests are use For Agricultural Purposes.

Transport facility is special from infrastructural facilities. The part of Colombo - Trincomalee main road (A06 Grade) Running Through Habarana and Kanthale. Also the part of Maradankadawala - Batticolo main road (A11 Grade) running through Habarana and Jayanthipura.

The main Economic Crop is rice in Hingurakgoda Division. Minneriya Girithale and Kaudulla are main Irrigation systems which are supplying water for rice .As well as there are many Small irrigation systems in this division.

In addition there are many Historical values in Hingurakgoda division.

Vision 
Efficient productive Exclusive

peoplehospitality

Through co-operation

Mission 
Providing Services According

to thePolicies of the Government and

Co - ordinating of Resources

Uplift Living Standard of the People

in the Division through an Efficient and

Sustainable planned

Development Process with the

participation of the People.

History of Hingurakgoda Divisional Seceateries

Citizen Charter of Grama Niladhari

Citizen Charter of Divisional Secretariat 

Divisional Secretariats of Polonnaruwa District